Classics is the fifth studio album by Canadian country music singer George Canyon. The album is a collection of classic country songs covered by Canyon. Of the album, Canyon said:

Track listing
 "Ring of Fire" (June Carter Cash, Merle Kilgore) – 2:43
 "Seven Spanish Angels" (Troy Seals, Eddie Setser) – 4:01
 "Theme From 'The Dukes of Hazzard' (Good Ol' Boys)" (Waylon Jennings) – 2:37
 "Luckenbach, Texas (Back to the Basics of Love)" (Bobby Emmons, Chips Moman) – 3:27
 "Good Hearted Woman" (Jennings, Willie Nelson) – 3:37
 "He Stopped Loving Her Today" (Bobby Braddock, Curly Putman) – 3:23
 "You're My Best Friend" (Wayland Holyfield) – 2:37
 "Kiss an Angel Good Mornin'" (Ben Peters) – 2:06
 "Okie from Muskogee" (Roy Edward Burris, Merle Haggard) – 2:46
 "Hello Darlin'" (Conway Twitty) – 2:28
 "Release Me" (Eddie Miller, Dub Williams, Robert Yount) – 2:47
 "Folsom Prison Blues" (Johnny Cash) – 2:46
 "The Battle of New Orleans" (Jimmy Driftwood) – 2:55

Certifications

References

George Canyon albums
2007 albums